Blue Mountain Township, Arkansas may refer to:

 Blue Mountain Township, Logan County, Arkansas
 Blue Mountain Township, Stone County, Arkansas

See also 
 List of townships in Arkansas
 Blue Mountain (disambiguation)

Arkansas township disambiguation pages